Ganzfried is a surname. Notable people with the surname include:

 Shlomo Ganzfried (1804–1886), Hungarian rabbi
  (born 1958), Swiss author

Jewish surnames
German-language surnames
Hungarian Jews